Gloria Bautista Cuevas (born 16 March 1953) is a Mexican politician affiliated with the PRD. She currently serves as Deputy of the LXII Legislature of the Mexican Congress representing Oaxaca.

References

1953 births
Living people
Politicians from Oaxaca
Women members of the Chamber of Deputies (Mexico)
Party of the Democratic Revolution politicians
21st-century Mexican politicians
21st-century Mexican women politicians
People from Huajuapan de León
Deputies of the LXII Legislature of Mexico
Members of the Chamber of Deputies (Mexico) for Oaxaca